Rivers in Japan are classified according to criteria set by the , which was introduced in 1967. Rivers are designated as Class A or Class B river systems by the Ministry of Land, Infrastructure, Transport and Tourism (MLIT).

Class A rivers 
 is a designation applied to rivers and waterways deemed to be important to the economy of the nation as a whole, as well as those deemed important to the conservation of nature within Japan. There are currently 109 rivers with this designation.

List of Class A river systems 
The number of dams only includes existing and unestablished dams that meet the criteria ( or more in bank height) of the River Law. The management entity is irrelevant. The number in parentheses is the number of dams on the main river, excluding tributaries.

The acronym BOD refers to biochemical oxygen demand.

Hokkaidō Development Bureau

Tōhoku Development Bureau

Kantō Development Bureau

Hokuriku Development Bureau

Chūbu Development Bureau

Kinki Development Bureau

Chūgoku Development Bureau

Shikoku Development Bureau

Kyūshū Development Bureau

Class B rivers

References

Environmental law in Japan
/